Clay Cross Tunnel is a  tunnel on the former North Midland Railway  line near Clay Cross in Derbyshire, England, now part of the Midland Main Line.

Construction

It was designed by George Stephenson with an estimate of £96,000 for construction. The tenders for the work were issued by the North Midland Railway in December 1836. The contractors appointed were Messrs. Hardy, Copeland and Cropper of Watford for the sum of £105,400. Approximately 15 million bricks were required for the tunnel lining.

Construction began on 2 February 1837 when the first sod was turned for the sinking of the ventilation shaft in the centre of the tunnel. The boring of the tunnel  was not straightforward, eventually costing £140,000 (equivalent to £ in ), instead of the expected £98,000 (equivalent to £ in ), with the loss of fifteen lives.

It was reported in August 1839  that the tunnel excavation was completed, and the last brick was expected to be laid within a few days, but in fact was not completed until 18 December 1839.

Description

It begins at the former Derbyshire summit of the line, also the highest point of the whole line, just after the old Stretton railway station. Situated at the watershed of the rivers  Amber and Rother.

Until the building of the tunnel, no deep prospecting for minerals had been carried out. The discovery of coal and iron led to  George Stephenson moving to Tapton House, near Chesterfield. With a group of others, he bought a tract of land north of the tunnel and set up a company, George Stephenson and Co., later renamed the Clay Cross Company.

The northern portal is a magnificent Moorish design and is now Grade II listed. The south portal is also Grade II listed 

Clay Cross railway station was at the northern end, where the line was met by that from the Erewash Valley.

The tunnel saw one of the first uses of the absolute block signalling system, maybe after a narrow escape on the south bound  inaugural run. The train was heavier than expected and a pilot engine was provided at the rear. This was detached at the entrance to the tunnel, but halfway through the train came to a halt, and someone had to walk back for the pilot, to the consternation of the passengers. Stephenson had been shown the system by its inventor William Fothergill Cooke supported by Wheatstone of the Wheatstone bridge fame. This was the forerunner of the Midland Railway's system.

See also
Listed buildings in Clay Cross

References

Sources

External links

Extract for the Accident at Clay Cross Tunnel on 29 March 1844

Grade II listed buildings in Derbyshire
Railway tunnels in England
Rail transport in Derbyshire
Tunnels in Derbyshire
History of Derbyshire
Tunnels completed in 1839
Midland Railway